Cadeau, the French word for gift, may refer to:

Le Cadeau, a 1982 French–Italian film
Dayana Cadeau (born 1966), a Haitian-born Canadian American professional bodybuilder
Lally Cadeau (born 1948), a Canadian actor
Rival Cadeau (born 1964), a Seychellois boxer
Michel Cadotte (1764–1837), also rendered Michel Cadeau, a Métis fur trader of Ojibwe and French-Canadian descent

See also
"Si la vie est cadeau", a song which won the 1983 Eurovision Song Contest